Francesca Kao (born 24 August 1972) is a Taiwanese Tsou actress, singer and television host,
known for her duet with Jacky Cheung, "You're the Most Precious".

Since 2003, Kao has acted in numerous television series and films. She has won two Golden Bell Awards, one in 2007 and another in 2010, for her roles in the Da Ai dramas Beautiful Dawn and Green Lawn. She is the granddaughter of Uyongʉ Yata'uyungana.

Filmography

Television series

Film

Television show

Music video

Discography

Studio albums

Compilation albums

Theater

Awards and nominations

References

External links

 
 
 

1972 births
Living people
People from Chiayi County
20th-century Taiwanese actresses
21st-century Taiwanese actresses
Taiwanese film actresses
Taiwanese television actresses
Taiwanese stage actresses
Tsou people
20th-century Taiwanese women singers
21st-century Taiwanese women singers
Taiwanese women television presenters
Taiwanese actresses
Actresses of Chinese descent
Taiwanese singers